International Personal Finance is a British-based international home credit business and digital business. It is listed on the London Stock Exchange. It took a secondary listing on the Warsaw Stock Exchange in March 2013. It has a head office in Leeds, West Yorkshire.

History
The company was first established as a division of Provident Financial in 1997. It was demerged from Provident Financial in 2007 and went on to acquire Maritime Commercial Bank of Kaliningrad in 2008. IPF acquired digital loans company MCB Finance in 2015.

Operations
The company has operations organised as follows:
 Poland - home credit and digital
 Hungary (:hu:Provident) - home credit
 Romania - home credit
 Czech Republic - home credit
 Mexico - home credit and digital
 Spain - digital
 Australia - digital
 Finland - digital
 Latvia - digital
 Lithuania - digital
 Estonia - digital

References

External links
 Official site

Financial services companies established in 1997
Companies based in Leeds
Companies listed on the London Stock Exchange
Personal finance